Winston Frederick Justice (born September 14, 1984) is a former American football offensive tackle. He was drafted by the Philadelphia Eagles in the second round (39th overall pick) of the 2006 NFL Draft. He played college football at USC.

Currently, Winston Justice is a vice president based in Bernstein's Nashville headquarters, serving as an asset manager to multigenerational families, entrepreneurs, and nonprofits. Prior to joining Bernstein in 2019, he was a portfolio manager for PIA's Alternative Investments Group. Earlier, he co-founded MJC Capital, an early-stage investment vehicle, and also served as a portfolio manager for Wells Fargo Securities.

He holds BA in Public Policy from the University of Southern California, an MBA from George Washington University, and the Certified Investment Management Analyst designation from The Yale School of Management.

Winston's philanthropic work includes serving on the board of directors for YCAP, Nashville Coaching Coalition, and service efforts with Habitat for Humanity of Collier County, Young Life Naples, and Eagles Fly for Leukemia in Philadelphia. In 2010, he was the recipient of the Walter Payton Philadelphia Man of the Year award. He relocated to Nashville in 2018 with his wife and their three children.

Early years
Justice attended Long Beach Polytechnic High School in Long Beach, California.

College career
Justice played college football at the University of Southern California.  He was regarded as one of the best tackles to come out of USC.  Justice blocked for two Heisman Trophy winners and 1 former (quarterbacks Carson Palmer and Matt Leinart, and running back Reggie Bush).

Professional career

Philadelphia Eagles
Justice was selected in the second round with the 39th overall pick by the Philadelphia Eagles in the 2006 NFL Draft. However, the Eagles did consider using their first round draft pick on him. Many considered him a first round pick because of his athleticism and other abilities.

His first NFL start came against the New York Giants on September 30, 2007. In the Eagles' 16–3 loss, Justice allowed six sacks. Justice was outmatched by defensive end Osi Umenyiora of the Giants in his first appearance in the NFL. Justice made his second career start against the Carolina Panthers on September 13, 2009, and played well against star defensive end Julius Peppers.

After starting right tackle Shawn Andrews was placed on injured reserve due to a back injury on September 15, 2009, Justice became the full-time starter at the position.  Justice started all sixteen games in 2009.

On November 24, 2009, Justice was given a four-year contract extension, which put him under contract until the end of the 2013 season.

In 2010, he was the recipient of the Walter Payton Philadelphia Man of the Year award. Justice was also a player elected team representative and helped advocate for this teammates.

Justice was placed on the active/physically unable to perform list on July 28, 2011, due to a knee injury. He was activated on September 3.

Indianapolis Colts
Justice was traded to the Indianapolis Colts on March 14, 2012, along with the Eagles' sixth round pick in 2012 for the Colts' sixth round pick in 2012.

Denver Broncos
On September 18, 2013, the Denver Broncos signed Justice after starting left offensive tackle Ryan Clady suffered a season-ending foot sprain.  In 2014, the Denver Broncos re-signed Justice.

Personal life
Justice is a Christian. Justice has spoken about his faith saying, "I work to glorify God. ... I think my goal is to be a great offensive tackle. But, my major goal is to glorify God. I want people to see Christ in me, when I play. Not being fearful, to giving his all on every play."

Winston Justice currently lives in Nashville with his wife Dania and three children Selah, Calais, and Tali.

References

External links
Denver Broncos bio
Philadelphia Eagles bio

1984 births
Living people
Players of American football from Long Beach, California
American football offensive tackles
USC Trojans football players
Philadelphia Eagles players
Indianapolis Colts players
Denver Broncos players
Long Beach Polytechnic High School alumni